Euphorbia remyi is a rare species of flowering plant in the family Euphorbiaceae. It is known by the common name Remy's sandmat locally as akoko.

There are two remaining varieties of this species, vars. remyi and kauaiensis, both of which were federally listed as endangered species in 2010. The third variety, var. hanaleiensis, has been declared extinct, having not been located since the nineteenth century.

References

External links

remyi
Endemic flora of Hawaii
Biota of Kauai
Taxa named by Pierre Edmond Boissier
Taxa named by Asa Gray